The Kremenchuk Reservoir is the largest water reservoir located on the Dnieper River. Named for the city of Kremenchuk, it covers a total area of 2,250 square kilometres in the territories of the Poltava, Cherkasy, and Kirovohrad Oblasts in central Ukraine.

The reservoir is 149 km long, 28 km wide, and has an average depth of six meters. The total water volume is 13.5 km³.
It is mainly used for irrigation, flood control, fishing, and transport within the area. The main ports located on the reservoir are Cherkasy, and Svitlovodsk (originally Khrushchev). The Sula River flows into the reservoir, forming a delta with numerous islands.

The reservoir was created in 1959 when the Kremenchuk Hydroelectric Power Plant was built. The body of water flooded the whole Novoheorhivsk Raion with 23 populated places ending up submerged including such historical places like Kryliv, Novoheorhivsk and others.

|
|

See also
 Threat of the Dnieper reservoirs

References

External links 
 1:100,000 topographic map, showing the dam that creates the reservoir 

Reservoirs built in the Soviet Union
Reservoirs in Ukraine
Geography of Cherkasy Oblast
Reservoirs of the Dnieper
1959 establishments in Ukraine